Joseph Harry Fowler Connick Jr. (born September 11, 1967) is an American singer, pianist, composer, actor, and television host. As of 2019, he has sold over 30 million records worldwide. Connick is ranked among the top60 best-selling male artists in the United States by the Recording Industry Association of America, with 16million in certified sales. He has had seven top20 US albums, and ten number-one US jazz albums, earning more number-one albums than any other artist in US jazz chart history.

Connick's best-selling album in the United States is his Christmas album When My Heart Finds Christmas (1993). His highest-charting album is his release Only You (2004), which reached No.5 in the US and No.6 in Britain. He has won three Grammy Awards and two Emmy Awards. He played Leo Markus, the husband of Grace Adler (played by Debra Messing) on the NBC sitcom Will & Grace from 2002 to 2006.

Connick began his acting career as a tail gunner in the World War II film Memphis Belle (1990). He played a serial killer in Copycat (1995) before being cast as a fighter pilot in the blockbuster Independence Day (1996). Connick's first role as a leading man was in Hope Floats (1998) with Sandra Bullock. He also lent his voice to the animated cult classic The Iron Giant (1999). His first thriller film since Copycat was Basic (2003) with John Travolta. Additionally, he played a violent ex-husband in Bug, before two romantic comedies, P.S. I Love You (2007), and the leading man in New in Town (2009) with Renée Zellweger. In 2011, he appeared in the family film Dolphin Tale as Dr. Clay Haskett and in its 2014 sequel.

Early life
Harry Connick Jr. was born and raised in New Orleans. His mother, Anita Frances  Livingston (née Levy), was a lawyer and judge in New Orleans. His father, Harry Connick, was the district attorney of Orleans Parish from 1973 to 2003. His parents also owned a record store. Connick's father is a Roman Catholic of Irish, English, Northern Irish, and German ancestry. Connick's mother, who died of ovarian cancer, was Jewish (her parents had emigrated from Minsk and Vienna, respectively). Connick and his sister, Suzanna, were raised in the Lakeview neighborhood of New Orleans.

Connick started learning keyboards at age three, playing publicly at age five, and recording with a local jazz band at ten. When he was nine years old, Connick performed Beethoven's Piano Concerto No. 3 Opus 37 with the New Orleans Symphony Orchestra (now the Louisiana Philharmonic). Later he played a duet with Eubie Blake at the Royal Orleans Esplanade Lounge in New Orleans. The song was "I'm Just Wild About Harry". This was recorded for a Japanese documentary called Jazz Around the World. The clip was also shown in a Bravo special called Worlds of Harry Connick, Junior. in 1999. His musical talents were developed at the New Orleans Center for Creative Arts and under the tutelage of Ellis Marsalis Jr. and James Booker.

Connick attended Jesuit High School, Isidore Newman School, Lakeview School, and the New Orleans Center for Creative Arts which are all in New Orleans. Following an unsuccessful attempt to study jazz academically, and having given recitals in the classical and jazz piano programs at Loyola University, Connick moved to the 92nd Street YMHA in New York City to study at Hunter College and the Manhattan School of Music. There he met  Columbia Records executive, Dr. George Butler, who persuaded him to sign with Columbia. His first record, Harry Connick Jr., was a mainly instrumental album of standards. He soon acquired a reputation in jazz because of extended stays at high-profile New York City venues. His next album, 20, featured his vocals and added to this reputation.

Career

When Harry Met Sally..., chart and movie success 
Connick's reputation was growing, and director Rob Reiner asked him to provide a soundtrack for his romantic comedy When Harry Met Sally... (1989), starring Meg Ryan and Billy Crystal. The soundtrack consisted of several standards, including "It Had to Be You", "Let's Call the Whole Thing Off" and "Don't Get Around Much Anymore". The soundtrack earned double-platinum status in the United States. Connick won his first Grammy Award for Best Jazz Male Vocal Performance for his work on the soundtrack.

Connick made his screen debut in Memphis Belle (1990), based on a true story about a B-17 Flying Fortress bomber crew in World War II. In that year, he began a two-year world tour. In addition, he released two albums in July 1990: the instrumental jazz trio album Lofty's Roach Souffle and a big-band album of mostly original songs titled We Are in Love, which also went double platinum. We Are in Love earned him his second consecutive Grammy for Best Jazz Male Vocal.

"Promise Me You'll Remember", his contribution to the Godfather III soundtrack, was nominated for both an Academy Award and a Golden Globe Award in 1991. In a year of recognition, he was also nominated for an Emmy Award for Best Performance in a Variety Special for his PBS special Swingin' Out Live, which was also released as a video. In October 1991, he released his third consecutive multi-platinum album, Blue Light, Red Light, on which he wrote and arranged the songs. Also in October 1991, he starred in Little Man Tate, directed by Jodie Foster, playing the friend of a child prodigy who goes to college.

In November 1992, Connick released 25, a solo piano collection of standards that again went platinum. He also re-released the album Eleven. Connick contributed "A Wink and a Smile" to the Sleepless in Seattle soundtrack, released in 1993. His multi-platinum album of holiday songs, When My Heart Finds Christmas, was the best-selling Christmas album in 1993.

Mid-1990s: funk 
In 1994, Connick decided to branch out. He released She, an album of New Orleans funk that also went platinum. In addition, he released a song called "(I Could Only) Whisper Your Name" for the soundtrack of The Mask, starring Jim Carrey, which is his most successful single in the United States to date.

Connick took his funk music on a tour of the United Kingdom in 1994, an effort that did not please some of his fans, who were expecting a jazz crooner. Connick also went on a tour of the People's Republic of China in 1995, playing at the Shanghai Center Theatre. The performance was televised live in China for what became known as the Shanghai Gumbo special. In his third film Copycat (1995), Connick played a serial killer who terrorizes a psychiatrist (played by Sigourney Weaver). The following year, he released his second funk album, Star Turtle, which did not sell as well as previous albums, although it did reach No. 38 on the charts. However, he appeared in the most successful movie of 1996, Independence Day, with Will Smith and Jeff Goldblum.

Late 1990s: Jazz and Hope Floats 
For his 1997 release To See You, Connick recorded original love songs, touring the United States and Europe with a full symphony orchestra backing him and his piano in each city. As part of his tour, he played at the Nobel Peace Prize Concert in Oslo, Norway, with his final concert of that tour in Paris being recorded for a Valentine's Day special on PBS in 1998. He also continued his film career, starring in Excess Baggage (1997) opposite Alicia Silverstone and Benicio del Toro.

In May 1998, he had his first leading role in director Forest Whitaker's Hope Floats, with Sandra Bullock as his female lead. In 1999 he released Come By Me, his first album of big band music in eight years, and embarked on a world tour, visiting the United States, Europe, Japan and Australia. In addition, he provided the voice of Dean McCoppin in the animated film The Iron Giant.

2000–2002: Broadway debut, musicals, Will & Grace 
Connick wrote the score for Susan Stroman's Broadway musical Thou Shalt Not, based on Émile Zola's novel Thérèse Raquin, in 2000; it premiered in 2001. His music and lyrics earned a Tony Award nomination. He was also the narrator of the film My Dog Skip, released in that year.

In March 2001, Connick starred in a television production of South Pacific with Glenn Close, televised on the ABC network. He also starred in his twelfth movie, Mickey, featuring a screenplay by John Grisham. In October 2001, he released two albums: Songs I Heard, featuring big band re-workings of children's show themes, and 30, featuring Connick on piano with guest appearances by several other musical artists. Songs I Heard won Connick another Grammy for Best Traditional Pop Album, and he toured performing songs from the album, holding matinees at which each parent had to be accompanied by a child.

Connick appeared as Grace Adler's boyfriend (and later husband) Leo Markus on the NBC sitcom Will & Grace from 2002 to 2006.

2003–2005: Connick on Piano and Only You 
In July 2003, Connick released his first instrumental album in fifteen years, Other Hours Connick on Piano Volume 1. It was released on Branford Marsalis' new label Marsalis Music and led to a short tour of nightclubs and small theaters. Connick appeared in the film Basic. In October 2003, he released his second Christmas album, Harry for the Holidays, which went gold and reached No. 12 on the Billboard 200 albums chart. He also had a television special on NBC featuring Whoopi Goldberg, Nathan Lane, Marc Anthony and Kim Burrell. Only You, his seventeenth album for Columbia Records, was released in February 2004. A collection of 1950s and 1960s ballads, Only You, went top ten on both sides of the Atlantic and was certified gold in the United States in March 2004. The Only You tour with big band went on in America, Australia and a short trip to Asia. Harry for the Holidays was certified platinum in November 2004. A music DVD Harry Connick Jr."Only You" in Concert was released in March 2004, after it had first aired as a Great Performances special on PBS. The special won him an Emmy Award for Outstanding Music Direction. The DVD received a Gold & Platinum Music VideoLong Form awards from the RIAA in November 2005.

An animated holiday special, The Happy Elf, aired on NBC in December 2005, with Connick as the composer, the narrator, and one of the executive producers. Shortly after, it was released on DVD. The holiday special was based on his original song The Happy Elf, from his 2003 album Harry for the Holidays. Another album from Marsalis Music was recorded in 2005, Occasion : Connick on Piano, Volume 2, a duo album with Harry Connick Jr. on piano together with Branford Marsalis on saxophone. A music DVD, A Duo Occasion, was filmed at the Ottawa International Jazz Festival 2005 in Canada, and released in November 2005.

He appeared in another episode of NBC sitcom Will & Grace in November 2005, and appeared in an additional three episodes in 2006.

2006–2008: The Pajama Game, Bug and P.S. I Love You 

Bug, a film directed by William Friedkin, is a psychological thriller filmed in 2005 starring Connick, Ashley Judd, and Michael Shannon. The film was released in 2007. He starred in the Broadway revival of The Pajama Game, produced by the Roundabout Theater Company, along with Michael McKean and Kelli O'Hara, at the American Airlines Theatre in 2006. It ran from February 23 to June 17, 2006, including five benefit performances running from June 13 to 17. Connick's performance was highly acclaimed; as David Rooney wrote in Variety, "With his handsome wholesomeness and those mellifluous Sinatra-esque pipes, it’s hard to imagine a leading man more tailor-made for this 1954 show." The Pajama Game cast recording was nominated for a Grammy, after being released as part of Connick's double disc album Harry on Broadway, Act I.

He hosted The Weather Channel's miniseries 100 Biggest Weather Moments which aired in 2007. He was part of the documentary Note by Note: The Making of Steinway L1037, released in November 2007. He sat in playing piano on Bob French's 2007 album Marsalis Music Honors Series: Bob French. He appeared in the film P.S. I Love You, released in December 2007. A third album in the Connick on Piano series, Chanson du Vieux Carré was released in 2007, and Connick received two Grammy nominations for the track "Ash Wednesday", for the Grammy awards in 2008. Chanson du Vieux Carré was released simultaneously with the album Oh, My NOLA. Connick toured North America and Europe in 2007, and toured Asia and Australia in 2008, as part of his My New Orleans Tour. Connick did the arrangements for, wrote a couple of songs, and sang a duet on Kelli O'Hara's album that was released in May 2008. He was also the featured singer at the Concert of Hope immediately preceding Pope Benedict XVI's Mass at Yankee Stadium in April 2008. He had the starring role of Dr. Dennis Slamon in the Lifetime television film Living Proof (2008). His third Christmas album, What a Night!, was released in November 2008.

Harry has a vast knowledge of musical genres and vocalists, even Gospel music. One of his favorite Gospel artists is Stellar Award winner and Grammy nominated artist Kim Burrell of Houston, Texas. "And when Harry Connick Jr. assembled a symphony orchestra for Pope Benedict XVI’s appearance at Yankee Stadium in 2008, he wanted Burrell on vocals"

2009–2011: New in Town, Your Songs 

The film New in Town starring Connick and Renée Zellweger, began filming in January 2008, and was released in January 2009. Connick's album Your Songs was released on CD, September 22, 2009. In contrast to Connick's previous albums, this album is a collaboration with a record company producer, the multiple Grammy Award winning music executive Clive Davis.

Connick starred in the Broadway revival of On a Clear Day You Can See Forever, which opened at the St. James Theatre in November 2011 in previews. It closed in January 2012, after 29 previews and 57 performances.

American Idol (Season 9) 

Connick appeared on the May 4, 2010 episode of American Idol season 9, where he acted as a mentor for the top 5 finalists. He appeared again the next night on May 5 to perform "And I Love Her".

2012–2019: Law & Order: Special Victims Unit, Every Man Should Know 
On January 6, 2012, NBC president Robert Greenblatt announced at the Television Critics Association winter press tour that Connick had been cast in a four-episode arc of NBC's long-running legal drama, Law & Order: Special Victims Unit as new Executive ADA, David Haden, a prosecutor who is assigned a case with Detective Olivia Benson (Mariska Hargitay).

Every Man Should Know 
On June 11, 2013, Connick released a new album of all original music titled Every Man Should Know. Connick debuted the title track live on May 2, 2013 episode of American Idol and appeared on The Ellen DeGeneres Show the following week to discuss his new project. A 2013 US summer tour was announced in support of the album.

American Idol (Seasons 12–15) 
Connick returned to American Idol to mentor the top four of season 12. He performed "Every Man Should Know" on the results show the following night.

Connick was on the judging panel for seasons 13, 14 and 15 of American Idol, airing in 2014 to 2016.

Angels Sing 
Angels Sing, a family Christmas movie released in November 2013 by Lionsgate, afforded Connick an onscreen collaboration with fellow musician Willie Nelson. The two wrote a special song exclusively for the movie. Shot in Austin, Texas, Angels Sing features actor/musicians Connie Britton, Lyle Lovett, and Kris Kristofferson and is directed by Tim McCanlies, who previously worked with Connick in The Iron Giant.

Harry 

A one-hour weekday daytime talk show starring Connick called Harry debuted on September 12, 2016.

Playground Sessions 
In January 2019, it was announced that Connick was hired by piano instruction software company Playground Sessions as a video instructor.

True Love: A Celebration of Cole Porter
On October 25, 2019, he released a new album of Cole Porter compositions rearranged by Connick himself from Porter's The Great American Songbook including “Anything Goes” and “You Do Something To Me.” After selecting the songs, and writing and orchestrating the arrangements, he assembled and conducted the orchestra which features his longtime touring band with additional horns and a full string section.

Along with his album, Connick announced his return to Broadway on September 16, 2019 with Harry Connick Jr. — A Celebration of Cole Porter, a multimedia celebration of the Cole Porter songbook. The production was conceived and directed by Connick himself with the addition of theatrical and film elements accompanied by a company of dancers and an onstage orchestra.

2020–present: Alone With My Faith, Annie 
Harry released his new album Alone With My Faith on March 19, 2021. With the Coronavirus pandemic casting a long shadow in 2020, Connick retreated to his home studio during the lockdown and emerged with an album of new music. He arranged all of the songs, played every instrument, and sang every part. In addition to the familiar, traditional songs, Connick wrote and recorded new tracks that tell the story of his experience coping during lockdown and feeling the full spectrum of emotions that came with it. Both the album cover and the music videos for “Amazing Grace” and “Alone With My Faith” were conceived and directed by Harry’s daughter Georgia Connick.  Alone With My Faith earned Connick his 16th career GRAMMY nomination for Best Roots Gospel Album as part of the 64th annual GRAMMY awards.

Annie Live! 
Harry joined the cast of Annie Live! as Sir Oliver "Daddy" Warbucks - opposite Taraji P. Henson's devious Miss Hannigan. The live production aired December 2, 2021 on NBC and also coincided with the release of the Annie Live! Cast Album – the original soundtrack of the NBC television event.

Australian Idol (2023) 

On 28 September 2022, Australia’s Seven Network announced Connick Jr. would be a judge on the revival of Australian Idol in 2023.

Touring Big Band members 
The following musicians have toured as the Harry Connick Jr. Big Band since its inception in 1990:
 Piano and vocalsHarry Connick Jr.
 DrumsShannon Powell, Duffy Jackson, Arthur Latin II (Winard Harper, Jeff "Tain" Wattssubs)
 BassBen Wolfe, Neal Caine
 GuitarJonathan Dubose Jr., Evan Vidar (Bryan Suttonsubs)
 Piano, KeyboardsHarry Connick Jr., Howard Kaplan, Jonathan Batiste
 Lead trumpetRoger Ingram (Dave Stahl, Walter White, Walt Johnsonsubs)
 2nd trumpetDan Miller, Derrick Gardner, Bijon Watson, Sal Cracchiolo (Earl Gardner, Greg Gisbert, Darryl Shawsubs)
 3rd trumpetJeremy Davenport, Joe Magnarelli, Mark Braud
 4th trumpetLeroy Jones, Mark Braud
 Lead alto saxophoneBrad Leali, Mike Smith, Jon Gordon, Ned Goold, Geoff Burke
 2nd alto saxophoneMark Sterbank, Will Campbell, Ned Goold
 1st tenor saxophoneJerry Weldon (Geoff Burke sub)
 2nd tenor saxophoneJimmy Greene, Ned Goold
 Baritone saxophoneDave Schumacher (Howard Johnsonsub)
 ClarinetLouis Ford
 Lead tromboneMark Mullins, John Allred, Jeff Bush
 2nd tromboneCraig Klein, John Allred
 3rd tromboneLucien Barbarin, Craig Klein
 Bass tromboneJoe Barati
 VocalsJonathan Dubose Jr., Jonathan Batiste (The Honolulu Heartbreakers – subs)

Connick and New Orleans, Hurricane Katrina 

Connick, a New Orleans native, is a founder of the Krewe of Orpheus which is a music-based New Orleans krewe. It takes its name from Orpheus of classical mythology. The Krewe of Orpheus parades on St. Charles Avenue and Canal Street in New Orleans on Lundi Gras (Fat Monday)the day before Mardi Gras (Fat Tuesday).

On September 2, 2005, Connick helped organize and appeared in the NBC-sponsored live telethon concert, A Concert for Hurricane Relief, for relief in the wake of Hurricane Katrina. He spent several days touring the city to draw attention to the plight of citizens stranded at the Ernest N. Morial Convention Center and other places. At the concert he paired with host Matt Lauer and entertainers including Tim McGraw, Faith Hill, Kanye West, Mike Myers, and John Goodman.

On September 6, 2005, Connick was made honorary chair of Habitat for Humanity's Operation Home Delivery, a long-term rebuilding plan for families who survived Hurricane Katrina in New Orleans and along the Gulf Coast. His actions in New Orleans earned him a Jefferson Award for Public Service.

Connick's album Oh, My NOLA, and Chanson du Vieux Carré were released in 2007, with a following tour called the My New Orleans Tour.

Musicians' Village 

Connick and Branford Marsalis devised an initiative to help restore New Orleans' musical heritage. Habitat for Humanity and New Orleans Area Habitat for Humanity, working with Connick and Marsalis announced on December 6, 2005, plans for a Musicians' Village in New Orleans. The Musicians' Village includes Habitat-constructed homes, with an Ellis Marsalis Center for Music, as the area's centerpiece. The Habitat-built homes provide musicians, and anyone else who qualifies, the opportunity to buy decent, affordable housing.

In 2012, Connick and Marsalis received the S. Roger Horchow Award for Greatest Public Service by a Private Citizen, an award given out annually by Jefferson Awards.

Personal life 
On April 16, 1994, Connick married former Victoria's Secret model Jill Goodacre, who is originally from Texas, at the St. Louis Cathedral, New Orleans. Jill is the daughter of sculptor Glenna Goodacre, originally from Lubbock, and now Santa Fe, New Mexico. The song "Jill", on the album Blue Light, Red Light (1991) is about her. They have three daughters: Georgia Tatum (born April 17, 1996), Sarah Kate (born September 12, 1997), and Charlotte (born June 26, 2002). The family lives in both New Orleans, Louisiana, and New Canaan, Connecticut.

Connick is a practicing Roman Catholic.

In 2011, Harry wrote Kate's debut song "A Lot Like Me". The song was released to celebrate the debut of American Girl's newest historical characters Cecile Rey and Marie Grace Gardner. "A Lot Like Me" is available on iTunes. The proceeds from "A Lot Like Me" went towards Ellis Marsalis Center for Music.

Connick is a supporter of hometown NFL franchise New Orleans Saints. He was caught on camera at the Super Bowl XLIV, which the Saints won, in Miami by the television crew of The Ellen DeGeneres Show during the post-game celebrations. Ellen's mother Betty was on the sidelines watching the festivities when she spotted Connick in the stands sporting a Drew Brees jersey.

Connick was arrested by the Port Authority Police in December 1992 and charged with having a 9mm pistol in his possession at JFK International Airport. After spending a day in jail, he agreed to make a public-service television commercial warning against breaking gun laws. The court agreed to drop all charges if Connick stayed out of trouble for six months.

Discography 

 Dixieland Plus (1977)
 Pure Dixieland (1979)
 Harry Connick Jr. (1987)
 20 (1988)
 When Harry Met Sally (1989) [Soundtrack album]
 We Are in Love (1990)
 Lofty's Roach Souffle (1990)
 Blue Light, Red Light (1991)
 25 (1992)
 Eleven (1992) [Re-release of Pure Dixieland]
 When My Heart Finds Christmas (1993)
 Forever For Now (1993) [Compilation album released in the UK]
 She (1994)
 Star Turtle (1996)
 To See You (1997)
 Come by Me (1999)
 30 (2001)
 Songs I Heard (2001)
 Thou Shalt Not (2002) [Cast recording]
 Other Hours: Connick on Piano, Volume 1 (2003)
 Harry for the Holidays (2003)
 Only You (2004)
 Occasion: Connick on Piano, Volume 2 (2005)
 Harry on Broadway, Act I (2006) [Cast recording]
 Oh, My NOLA (2007)
 Chanson du Vieux Carré : Connick on Piano, Volume 3 (2007)
 What a Night! A Christmas Album (2008)
 Your Songs (2009)
 In Concert on Broadway (2011) [Live album]
 Music from The Happy Elf: Connick on Piano, Volume 4 (2011)
 Smokey Mary (2013)
 Every Man Should Know (2013)
 That Would Be Me (2015)
 True Love: A Celebration of Cole Porter (2019)
 Alone With My Faith (2021)

Filmography

Film

Television

Broadway 
 1990 An Evening with Harry Connick Jr. and His Orchestra (special, concert)
 2001 Thou Shalt Not (Broadway Musical)composer
 2006 The Pajama Game (Broadway Musical)
 2010 Harry Connick Jr.: In Concert on Broadway (special, concert)
 2011 On a Clear Day You Can See Forever (Broadway Musical)
 2019 Harry Connick, Jr. - A Celebration of Cole Porter (special, concert)

References

Further reading
 Harry Connick Jr. interview by Pete Lewis, 'Blues & Soul' November 2009
 
 "Harry Connick Jr. discusses playing, singing and arranging." [radio transcript]. 2005. The Music Show. Presented by Andrew Ford.
 Article on Connick's United States patent 6,348,648 for a "system and method for coordinating music display among players in an orchestra."

External links
 
 
 
 

 
1967 births
20th-century American male actors
20th-century American male musicians
20th-century American singers
20th-century jazz composers
21st-century American male actors
21st-century American male musicians
21st-century American singers
21st-century jazz composers
American baritones
American crooners
American jazz bandleaders
American jazz composers
American jazz pianists
American jazz singers
American male film actors
American male jazz composers
American male jazz musicians
American male musical theatre actors
American male pianists
American male pop singers
American male singer-songwriters
American male stage actors
American male television actors
American people of English descent
American people of German descent
American people of Irish descent
American people of Jewish descent
American people of Northern Ireland descent
American Roman Catholics
Catholics from Louisiana
Columbia Records artists
Grammy Award winners
Hunter College alumni
Isidore Newman School alumni
Jazz arrangers
Jazz musicians from New Orleans
Jazz-funk pianists
Jesuit High School (New Orleans) alumni
Living people
Male actors from New Orleans
Manhattan School of Music alumni
Musicians from New Orleans
Primetime Emmy Award winners
Singer-songwriters from Louisiana
Swing pianists
Swing singers
Theatre World Award winners
Traditional pop music singers
Judges in American reality television series